Hans Olsen (1 January 1885 – 4 December 1969) was a Danish cyclist. He competed in two events at the 1912 Summer Olympics.

References

External links
 

1885 births
1969 deaths
Danish male cyclists
Olympic cyclists of Denmark
Cyclists at the 1912 Summer Olympics
People from Faxe Municipality
Sportspeople from Region Zealand